Benjamín Jaime Palazuelos Contreras (born June 21, 1996, in Culiacán, Sinaloa) is a Mexican professional footballer who currently plays for Dorados de Sinaloa.

References

External links
 

1996 births
Living people
Mexican footballers
Association football midfielders
Dorados de Sinaloa footballers
Ascenso MX players
Liga Premier de México players
Tercera División de México players
Sportspeople from Culiacán
Footballers from Sinaloa